China–Myanmar relations  are the international relations between the People's Republic of China and Myanmar. China and Myanmar have active bilateral relations with each other. In recent years, the relations between China and Myanmar have faced some problems due to ongoing clashes between ethnic Chinese rebels and the Myanmar military near the China–Myanmar border.

Bilateral relations between China and Myanmar, although much closer and warmer than those between China and its other Southeast Asian neighbor, Vietnam, also face difficulties due to the effects of alleged Chinese-sponsored debt-traps and Chinese-backed rebels in northern Myanmar territories.

History
Both two countries and peoples, as well as both countries' official languages, share a close relationship and the same linguistic link, in which both the Burmese and Chinese are both parts of Sino-Tibetan language family and peoples.

The Yuan dynasty saw the First Mongol invasion of Burma and Second Mongol invasion of Burma. The Qing dynasty fought the Sino-Burmese War. Both countries had conflicting claims on the Chinese Shan states ever since the Toungoo Empire rose to power, though trade with Ming China was beneficial for the Toungoo Empire. Ming loyalists escaped to Burma during the Manchu invasion of China. Large numbers of Panthays from China also settled in Myanmar.

The Burma Road was built to China during World War II.

Modern relations 
Burma was the first non-Communist country to recognize the Communist-led People's Republic of China after its foundation in 1949. According to Panikkar's memoir, India's ambassador to China from 1948 to 1952, “Indian government's recognition of the new Government of China should be conveyed to Peking by the end of the year. For some reason Burma was anxious that it should be the first State outside the Soviet bloc to recognize the New China and we were approached with a request to wait for a few days in order to give Burma the start. In due course, Burma announced its recognition and we followed in a few days.”

On 16 December, Burma's Foreign Minister E Maung gave a note to Zhou Enlai that Rangoon “decide to recognize PRC, and hope to establish diplomatic relations and exchange diplomatic envoys.” Two days later, Zhou Enlai replied that Beijing agreed to establish diplomatic relations with Rangoon and exchange diplomatic envoys each other on the premise of breaking relations with Kuomintang government.

However, Mao Zedong who was visiting Moscow, sent a telegram to Liu Shaoqi and Zhou Enlai on 19 December 1949 as to the question of the Burmese government's request to establish diplomatic relations with the People's Republic of China. Mao telegraphed Liu and Zhou to ask Burma in a return telegram their willingness to cut off its diplomatic relations with the Guomindang and invite Burmese government representative to dispatch to Beijing for discussions about establishing diplomatic relations between the PRC and Burma.

On 21 December, Zhou Enlai replied that after Burma's government broke off relations with Kuomintang government, “PRC central people government is willing to establish diplomatic relations between PRC and the Union of Burma on the basis of equality, mutual benefit, mutual respect for sovereignty and territorial integrity, and hope Burma's government dispatch a negotiator to Beijing.

Burma's Foreign Minister, Zaw Hkun Zhuo, wrote a letter to Zhou Enlai on 18 January 1950 that Burma's government had received Chou's message of 21 December 1949, and stated that Kuomintang's Embassy in Rangoon got the notice that Burma cut ties with it while Burma recognized PRC, so Taiwan's Embassy would be closed soon. Additionally, Rangoon appointed the former first secretary and consul general in Kunming to Guomindang government, U Phyo, temporary chargé d'affaires to new China to attend the negotiation of establishing diplomatic relations.

In late April 1950, Burma's negotiator U Phyo arrived in Beijing. On 29 April 5 May, and 12 May 1950, Zhang Hanfu, China's Vice-Foreign Minister, held three negotiations with U Phy. During the negotiation, both parties discussed the issues that Burma severed relations with Kuomintang, how Rangoon disposed all Kuomintang organizations and their estates in Burma. On 12 May, U Phyo orally replied that “Burma's government never recognized any other China Kuomintang organizations except former China's Embassy to Burma.” After Burma recognized new China, “former China Embassy is not recognized instantly, and the personnel of former China's Embassy are regarded as common citizens. Any property and fund of China in Burma will be transferred to the recognized government.”

Chinese Vice-Foreign Minister Zhang Hanfu replied on 19 May 1950 that China's government discussed Burma's reply on 12 May, and was satisfied with it. So China hoped that both sides immediately begun to negotiate the exchange of diplomatic envoys. Mao Zedong accepted the credentials from Burma's Ambassador in Beijing and Burma and the People's Republic of China formally established diplomatic relations on 8 June 1950. The Union of Burma became the sixteenth country establishing relations with new China. Burma officiated its embassy in Beijing on the same day. On 28 June, the PRC opened its embassy in Rangoon. Yao Zhongming, China's first Ambassador to Rangoon arrived in Rangoon on 28 August and presented his credentials on 5 September 1950.

With the symbol of exchange visit between two Premiers, Zhou Enlai and U Nu, in 1954, China-Burma relations began to boom. China and Burma signed a treaty of friendship and mutual non-aggression and promulgated a Joint Declaration on 29 June 1954, officially basing their relations on the Five Principles of Peaceful Co-existence. The relationship with China was under the spirit of the term "pauk-phaw", meaning kinship in Burmese. However, Burma maintained a neutralist foreign policy in the 1950s and 1960s. Anti-Chinese riots in 1967 and the expulsion of Chinese communities from Burma generated hostility in both countries. Relations began to improve significantly in the 1970s. Under the rule of Deng Xiaoping, China reduced support for the Communist Party of Burma ("CPB") and on 5 August 1988, China signed a major trade agreement, legalizing cross-border trading and began supplying considerably military aid. Following the violent repression of pro-democracy protests in 1988, the newly formed State Peace and Development Council, facing growing international condemnation and pressure, sought to cultivate a strong relationship with China to bolster itself; in turn, China's influence grew rapidly after the international community abandoned Burma.

2010s relations 

After the Kokang incident in August 2009 which gained international media interest, some experts questioned its impact on China–Myanmar relations, which were considered to be strong. Bertil Lintner stated that Myanmar was prioritizing internal conflicts over its ties with China, however some Chinese analysts, such as Shi Yinhong, played down the relationship between Myanmar and China, saying "They're not great friends. They don't listen to what China says." China had urged Myanmar to ensure the stability of the border area and protect the interests of its citizens in Myanmar. The Burmese Foreign Ministry later apologised to China about the incident, but also ran a story on the Dalai Lama in the government newspaper the Myanmar Times, the first mention of him in the state controlled Burmese media for 20 years. Chinese officials were said to be "furious" and "extremely upset" over not being forewarned about the offensive on the border.

In June 2015, Kokang rebels announced a unilateral ceasefire citing "the Chinese government's strong calls for restoring peace in the China–Myanmar border region" among other interests. The announcement coincided with Aung San Suu Kyi's meeting with Xi Jinping, General Secretary of the Chinese Communist Party in Beijing. Following international condemnation of the Rohingya genocide, observers have noted that Myanmar has tightened its relations with China.

In May 2018, China condemned Myanmar's government after violence in northern Myanmar erupted. The violence was started by a China-backed militia, rebelling against Myanmar. The militia, the Ta'ang National Liberation Army, sought to get more autonomy from the Burmese central government. In October 2018, militias backed by China against Myanmar expelled numerous clergies in northern Myanmar, sparking outrage throughout Myanmar. The Chinese-backed militia also threatened northern Myanmar residents from expressing their religious beliefs, even inside their homes.

In August 2018, various international organizations found a staggering rise in Chinese projects in Myanmar, which may cause ‘debt traps’ against Myanmar, the same way it was perceived as causing a debt-trap against Sri Lanka. Despite these reports, Myanmar's government continued with the Chinese loans and programs in November 2018, causing wide public concern. In February 2019, Myanmar pursued more Chinese-sponsored loans and programs.

In July 2019, UN ambassadors from 50 countries, including Myanmar, have signed a joint letter to the UNHRC defending China's treatment of Uyghurs and other Muslim minority groups in the Xinjiang region.

In January 2020, Commander-in-Chief Min Aung Hlaing met with Chinese leader Xi Jinping in Nay Pyi Taw. Xi promoted the practical cooperation under the framework of the One Belt One Road to achieve results at an early date and benefit Myanmar's people.

Recent relations

In February 2021, the Myanmar coup d'état removed a number of democratically elected members of parliament from power, including State Counsellor Aung San Suu Kyi. On 3 February, China and Russia blocked the United Nations Security Council from issuing a statement condemning the military for fear of additional economic sanctions. While the PRC initially downplayed the military coup as "a major cabinet reshuffle", it later expressed concern over the 12-month emergency declared by military leader Min Aung Hlaing, demanding the release of Aung San Suu Kyi.

On 16 February 2021, in reaction to protesters outside the Chinese embassy in Yangon, blaming China for the coup d'état, the Chinese ambassador Chen Hai said “the current development in Myanmar is absolutely not what China wants to see”. He dismissed the claim that China supports military rule in Myanmar as a “ridiculous rumour”.  Nonetheless, Chinese factories in the country were set ablaze as Burmese protesters did not trust China's response, leaving 39 people dead on 15 March; the Chinese embassy in Myanmar later responded by condemning the arson attacks, but was ridiculed by the protesters for not offering any sympathy to the protest movement. China also continued to supply food to Myanmar, which was seen by some as supportive of the military junta.

In mid-March 2021, China–Myanmar relations had seriously frayed due to ongoing civil unrest and military rule, jeopardizing Chinese investments in the country. In another report, it was stated that Myanmar's junta is trying to improve relations with the United States through the employment of a former Israeli military intelligence official. According to the source, Aung San Suu Kyi had grown too close to China for the generals’ liking. China has not supported military rule in Myanmar and attempts to resolve the conflict peacefully without foreign interference. Despite these statements, China has been, alongside Russia, frequently vetoing any UN resolutions condemning the increasing brutality of the Burmese military junta for fear of additional sanctions that would hurt the region economically. China is the second largest investor in Myanmar.

On 3 May 2021, China sent over 500,000 vaccines made by Chinese firms Sinovac and Sinopharm to Myanmar in order to combat the COVID-19 pandemic and to demonstrate the friendship (Paukphaw). The vaccines were previously approved by the WHO and represent a significant step to protect all citizens of Myanmar from the deadly disease. Anti-vaccine protesters considered it a sham, and distributed misinformation about Chinese vaccines on social media.

Commercial relations 
Like Sino-Burma political relations, the economic ties also shifted in 1954. On 22 April 1954, China and Burma signed the first economic trade agreement which was valid for three years. According to the agreement, China exported coal, silk, silk fabrics, cotton fabrics, paper, agricultural implements, light industry product, handicraft, porcelain enamel, porcelain, can food, tea, and cigarette to Burma. Burma exported rice, rice product, pulse seedcake, mineral, timber, rubber and cotton to China. On 3 November 1954, both signed goods exchange protocol of Burmese rice and Chinese commodities, and the contract that China bought 150,000 long tons Burmese rice.

Trade between China and Myanmar was nearly non-existent prior to 1988. After the imposition of Western sanctions in 1988, Myanmar-China trade grew 25% year-to-year until 1995, with some decline following the 1997 Asian financial crisis.

As of 2020-2021, bilateral trade between China and Myanmar exceeded $9.8 billion. Chinese exports to Myanmar typically focus around oil, steel and textile products, while Myanmar exports to China range from natural rubber to raw wood. China is providing extensive aid and helping to develop industries and infrastructure in Myanmar and aims to be the chief beneficiary from cultivating Myanmar's extensive oil and natural gas reserves. It is one of the chief partners of the Burmese regime in the project to renovate and expand the Sittwe seaport and has received rights to develop and exploit natural gas reserves in the Arakan region. China has offered loans and credit to the military regime, as well as economic aid and investments for the construction of dams, bridges, roads and ports as well as for industrial projects. China extensively aided the construction of strategic roads along the Irrawaddy River trade route linking Yunnan province to the Bay of Bengal. Chinese firms have been involved in the construction of oil and gas pipelines stretching  from Myanmar's Rakhine State to China's Yunnan Province. China National Offshore Oil Corporation and the China National Petroleum Corporation hold important contracts on upgrading Burmese oilfields and refineries and sharing of production. PetroChina is in process of building a major gas pipeline from the A-1 Shwe oil field off the coast of the Rakhine State leading to Yunnan, accessing and exploiting an estimated 2.88 to 3.56 trillion cubic feet of natural gas. A proposed Sino-Burmese oil pipeline off the western coast of Myanmar may permit China to import oil from the Middle East, bypassing the Strait of Malacca.  There have been protest against Chinese oil projects.

China Power Investment Corporation's investment in the $3.6 billion Myitsone hydropower station on the Irrawaddy River has hit a snagged in early October 2011 as Burmese government suspended construction due to local residents' concern about the human, environmental impact and perceived benefits. Most of the power generated will be exported to Yunnan province in China and local residents claimed the lack of community feedback in the planning process. China's government is stating Myanmar will get US$54 billion in tax revenue, shared profits, free electricity. At stake is China's huge financial stake in the project and also risk to other big projects China has in the country. China Power Investment Corporation stated only five villages with a total of 2,146 needed to relocated. The firm has provided affected villagers with two storey houses, 21 inch televisions and a 100,000 Burmese kyat.

Myanmar is China's key supplier not only for copper but also for rare earth metals required for high tech devices. More than 70% of China's production quota (35.5 t) is sourced from Myanmar (2020). While mining production continued steadily after the military coup in early 2021 (many mines are owned by members of the junta), logistics issues have hindered exports to China, creating decreasing supplies (particularly of dysprosium and terbium), and higher prices globally as a result.

In China's view, its cross-border trade with Myanmar is its most successful example of trade engagement with its smaller south western neighbors. Among all of the countries on China's southwest border, Myanmar has achieved the highest level of integration of transportation networks with China.

Human rights violations and other issues 
There have been multiple reports and complaints from locals related to human rights violations, accusations of land grab and environmental damage due to land acquisition and industrial activities by Chinese companies.

In 2010, nearly 8000 acres of land was confiscated from residents to expand a Chinese-backed copper mining project.

In November 2012, peaceful villagers protesting against the Letpadaung Copper Mine were attacked by police and Chinese workers. In the attacks, police used white phosphorus military munitions, resulting in burns and injuries to dozens of protesters including monks. The protests were due to coercion and intimidation of villagers to sign contracts the contents of which they were not allowed to read and misrepresentation of essential terms of the contract by falsely promising villagers that the land would be returned to them in three years, undamaged and in the same condition.

In 2015, Amnesty International discovered that a waste leak from the Letpadaung Copper Mine had run into nearby fields, severely contaminating it. A farmer interviewed by Amnesty International describing the effects said "Every crop perished. Everything died. Every place where the water got the crops perished. They perished steadily, taking around ten days. First the crops wilted and then died." Soil samples taken by Amnesty International were found to be contaminated with various metals, in particular arsenic, copper and lead.

In February 2018, about 800 villagers in Kachin State protested to the Chief Minister's office against environmental damage caused by Chinese companies planting tissue culture bananas.
In February 2019, two reporters were physically assaulted and forcibly detained by employees of a Chinese joint venture company "Tha Khin Sit Mining Company", for a previously published article about locals in Kachin objecting to tissue-culture banana plantations.

A report by human rights group Burma Campaign UK in December 2018 stated that Chinese companies make up the bulk of corporations named for involvement in human rights and environmental violations in Myanmar.

In June 2020, Myanmar was one of 53 countries that backed the Hong Kong national security law at the United Nations.

Human trafficking 
According to a report by Human Rights Watch, Burmese women and girls are sometimes sold for sexual slavery in China as "brides". Women were also reported to have been sold multiple times for the purpose of forced childbirth.

Strategic relations 

China is the most important supplier of military aid and maintains extensive strategic and military cooperation. Since 1989, China has supplied Myanmar with jet fighters, armored vehicles and naval vessels and has trained Burmese army, air force and naval personnel. Access to Myanmar's ports and naval installations provide China with strategic influence in the Bay of Bengal, in the wider Indian Ocean region and in Southeast Asia. China has developed a deep-water port on Kyaukpyu in the Bay of Bengal. It has also built an 85-metre jetty, naval facilities and major reconnaissance and electronic intelligence systems on the Great Coco Island, located 18 kilometres from India's Andaman and Nicobar Islands, giving China capabilities to monitor India's military activities, including missile tests. However the building of intelligence systems on the island is widely regarded as a myth today and the Indian forces recently denied their existence  China assists in constructing a naval base in Sittwe, a strategically important sea port close to eastern India's largest city and port, Kolkata. Beijing also funds road construction linking Yangon and Sittwe, providing the shortest route to the Indian Ocean from southern China.

China and Russia once vetoed a U.N. Security Council resolution designed to punish Myanmar. In recent years, China has shown a lack of willingness to back the Burmese government and has attempted to stabilize the political situation in Myanmar.

In recent years, Myanmar has moved to develop strategic and commercial relations with India, with which it shares a long land border and the Bay of Bengal. Increasing trade and military cooperation with India and developing bilateral relations with Japan and within the Association of South East Asian Nations (ASEAN) shows a shift in Myanmar's foreign policy to avoid excessive dependence on China. However, by 2018 India's involvement in Myanmar was still limited compared to China's political and economic influence in the country.

Diplomatic Missions

The Myanmar embassy in China is located in Beijing, whilst the Chinese embassy in Myanmar is located in Yangon. Myanmar also maintains consulates in Hong Kong, Kunming and Nanning. China maintains a consulate in Mandalay.

The current Chinese ambassador to Myanmar is Chen Hai. The last ambassador from Myanmar to China was Myo Thant Pe, who served from 2019 until his sudden death in August 2022 while in Yunnan province. Neither the State Administration Council nor the National Unity Government of Myanmar have designated a replacement.

See also

 BCIM Forum
 China–Myanmar border 
 Chinese people in Myanmar
 China and the Kachin State
 Foreign relations of Myanmar
 Internal conflict in Myanmar
 Kuomintang in Burma

References

Bibliography

 Lanuzo, Steve L. "The Impact of Political Liberalization on Sino Myanmar Cooperation" (Naval Postgraduate School, 2018) online.
 Narayanan, Raviprasad. "China and Myanmar: Alternating between ‘Brothers’ and ‘Cousins’." China Report 46.3 (2010): 253–265 online.
 Yian, Goh Geok. 2010. “The Question of 'china' in Burmese Chronicles”. Journal of Southeast Asian Studies 41 (1): 125–52. The Question of 'China' in Burmese Chronicles.

 
Myanmar
Bilateral relations of Myanmar
Economy of Yunnan